Otto Paul Trieloff (17 November 1885 – 6 July 1967) was a German athlete.  He competed at the 1908 Summer Olympics in London. He was born in Duisburg and died in Essen-Rüttenscheid.

Trieloff was a member of the silver medal German medley relay team.  He was the third runner on the squad, running 400 metres.  He followed Arthur Hoffmann and Hans Eicke, each of whom ran 200 metres, and was followed by Hanns Braun running the 800.

The team dominated the first round, defeating the Dutch team easily with a time of 3:43.2.  In the final, though, the Germans could not match the American team.  Trieloff in third place when he started his leg, and finished five yards behind the second place Hungarian team.  Braun was able to move into second place at the very end of the race, however, giving Trieloff a silver medal.

Trieloff also competed in the 400 metres event, finishing second in his first round heat and not advancing to the final.

References

Sources
 
 
 

1885 births
1967 deaths
German male sprinters
Olympic athletes of Germany
Athletes (track and field) at the 1908 Summer Olympics
Olympic silver medalists for Germany
Sportspeople from Duisburg
Medalists at the 1908 Summer Olympics
Olympic silver medalists in athletics (track and field)